The 2014–15 season is FK Borac 5th season in Premier League of Bosnia and Herzegovina. This article shows player statistics and all matches (official and friendly) that the club have and will play during the 2014–15 season.

Players

Squad statistics

Top scorers
Includes all competitive matches. The list is sorted by shirt number when total goals are equal.

Transfers

In

Out

FK Borac Banja Luka seasons
Borac Banja Luka